The 2016 UCI Europe Tour was the twelfth season of the UCI Europe Tour. The 2016 season began on 28 January 2016 with the Trofeo Santanyí-Ses Salines-Campos and ended on 23 October 2016 with the Chrono des Nations.

French rider Nacer Bouhanni, who scored 721 points in the 2015 edition, was the defending champion of the 2015 UCI Europe Tour.

Throughout the season, points were awarded to the top finishers of stages within stage races and the final general classification standings of each of the stages races and one-day events. The quality and complexity of a race also determined how many points were awarded to the top finishers; the higher the UCI rating of a race, the more points were awarded.

The UCI ratings from highest to lowest were as follows:
 Multi-day events: 2.HC, 2.1 and 2.2
 One-day events: 1.HC, 1.1 and 1.2

Events

January

February

March

April

May

June

July

August

September

October

Final standings

Individual classification

Teams classification

Nations classification

Nations under-23 classification

References

External links
 

 
UCI Europe Tour
2015 UCI Europe Tour
UCI